The Royal Welch Fusiliers Museum is a museum dedicated to the history of the Royal Welch Fusiliers, a historic regiment of the British Army. The museum is located within Caernarfon Castle in Caernarfon, Gwynedd, North Wales. Admission is included with entry to the castle.

History
The museum was established as the Royal Welch Fusiliers Regimental Museum at Caernarfon Castle on 2 June 1960.

Collection
The Royal Welch Fusiliers Museum has a collection and displays, containing links to the regiment's fourteen Victoria Crosses and the writers and poets who have served their country when enlisted in the regiment; men such as Siegfried Sassoon, Robert Graves, Hedd Wyn, David Jones and Frank Richards, and extensive displays relating the long history of the Royal Welch Fusiliers over the centuries.

References

External links

Royal Welch Fusiliers Museum at Ogilby Trust

Military and war museums in Wales
Regimental museums in Wales
Museums in Gwynedd
Royal Welch Fusiliers
Caernarfon
1960 establishments in Wales
Museums established in 1960